Denis Prieur (1791 – November 9, 1857) served twice as mayor of New Orleans, Louisiana. He served first as a Jacksonian from May 12, 1828, to April 9, 1838, after which he resigned to become of the mortgage registrar. He ran for governor in 1838, but was defeated by former Governor Andre B. Roman. He was again elected mayor, this time running as a Democrat, and served a second time from April 4, 1842, to February 7, 1843. In 1843, Prieur participated in a duel with political adversary and U.S. Senator George A. Waggaman, in which he fatally wounded the senator.

Sources
New Orleans Public Library

|-

|-

1791 births
1857 deaths
19th-century American politicians
Mayors of New Orleans